Sindhu Nair (born 6 October 1995) is a Singaporean netball player who represents Singapore internationally and plays in the positions of goal keeper, goal defence or wing defence. She was part of the Singaporean squad at the 2019 Netball World Cup, marking her first World Cup appearance.

Nair's netball career began at Singapore's Evergreen Primary School, where she starred alongside youth netball legend Sheena Suthen. In September 2019, she was included in the Singaporean squad for the 2019 M1 Nations Cup and was part of the national team which emerged as runners-up to Namibia in the final.

References 

1995 births
Living people
Singaporean netball players
Southeast Asian Games silver medalists for Singapore
Southeast Asian Games medalists in netball
Competitors at the 2019 Southeast Asian Games
2019 Netball World Cup players
Singaporean people of Malayali descent
Singaporean sportspeople of Indian descent